One Two Jaga (also known internationally as Crossroads: One Two Jaga) is a 2018 Malaysian Malay-language action crime film directed by Nam Ron and co-produced by Jazzy Pictures, KL POST, and Pixel Play. It stars Zahiril Adzim, Amerul Affendi, Ario Bayu, Asmara Abigail, Bront Palarae, and Azman Hassan. The film was released on 6 September 2018. One Two Jaga is the third film directed by Nam Ron. The uncensored version of the film was released worldwide on Netflix on 1 December 2018 as an original film.

Plot
The film portrays the lives of corrupt cops working for the Royal Malaysia Police who take bribes from small business owners and get caught in criminal activity.

Cast
Zahiril Adzim as Hussein
Ario Bayu as Sugiman
Rosdeen Suboh as Hassan 
Asmara Abigail as Sumiyati 
Amerul Affendi as Adi
Chew Kin Wah as James
Timothy Castillo as Rico
Iedil Putra as Marzuki
Along Eyzendy as Zul
Azman Hassan as Pak Sarip
Nam Ron as Dato'
Izuan Fitri as Joko
Vanida Imran as Wife
Anne James as Headmistress
Sabri Yunus as Seller
Bront Palarae as Inspector Rayyan
Farah Ahmad

Production
One Two Jaga first appeared when the movie concept trailer was released on YouTube in 2014. The film was directed by Ron who previously directed Gedebe (2013) and Psiko: Pencuri Hati (2013). Ron wrote the script with Ayam Fared, Pitt Hanif, Amri Rohayat, and Muhammad Syafiq. Bront Palarae and his wife, Rozi Isma, served as producers for Pixel Play.

Ron chose to highlight bribery as the main subject of the film. The cast is made up of actors from Malaysia and Indonesia, including Sofia Jane, Zaidi Omar, Amerul Affendi, Ario Bayu, and Asmara Abigail. The film script was rejected twice by former inspector-general of police Khalid Abu Bakar before it got the green light to be filmed.

Reception

Show
One Two Jaga was initially planned to be screened at various foreign film festivals. However, the producer decided that the film should also be screened at Malaysian cinemas. The film was officially released on 6 September 2018.

The first screening of One Two Jaga was on opening night of the Far East Film Festival in Udine, Italy on 29 April 2018. On 29 June 2018, One Two Jaga represented Malaysia at the 17th New York Asian Film Festival in New York. One Two Jaga was a commercial failure and Ron later expressed his disappointment on Twitter about the reaction to the film.

Critical reviews
Shazryn Mohd Faizal from mStar Online described One Two Jaga as "a precious work of Nam Ron and his colleagues ... although One Two Jaga is certainly not able to record tens of millions of dollars but aesthetics, exclusives, and souls which is precious is what makes One Two Jaga worth honored and respected."

Novel adaptation
The film was adapted into a 283-page novel of the same name by Sahidzan Salleh. The novel was published by Buku FIXI and released in May 2018.

Awards
One Two Jaga bagged 6awards including Best Film at the 30th Malaysia Film Festival (FFM30). The film also won two out of five nominations at the 2019 ASEAN International Film Festival And Awards (AIFFA).

References

External links
 

2018 films
Malaysian action films
2018 action films